Bronius (Bronislavas) Laurinavičius (17 July 1913 – 25 November 1981) was a Lithuanian priest, member of the Lithuanian Helsinki Group. 

He was killed in 1981 after reportedly being thrown by four men affiliated with the KGB onto a street where he was killed by an approaching truck. In 1998 he was awarded the Commander's Grand Cross of the Order of the Cross of Vytis.

References

1913 births
1981 deaths
20th-century Lithuanian Roman Catholic priests
Soviet dissidents
Commander's Grand Crosses of the Order of the Cross of Vytis
Pedestrian road incident deaths
20th-century Christian martyrs